BWIA West Indies Airways Limited, known locally as "Bee-Wee" and also as British West Indian Airways and BWIA International, was the national airline based in Trinidad and Tobago. At the end of operations, BWIA was the largest airline operating out of the Caribbean, with direct service to the United States, Canada, and the United Kingdom. Its main base was Piarco International Airport (POS), Piarco, with major hubs at Grantley Adams International Airport (BGI) and Cheddi Jagan International Airport (GEO) during 2006. It was headquartered in the BWIA Administration Building in Piarco, Tunapuna–Piarco on the island of Trinidad. The company slogan was Sharing our warmth with the world.

The company announced on 8 September 2006 that the airline would be shut down on 31 December 2006. All of the approximately 1700 employees were separated from the company but applied for new contracts with a new entity, Caribbean Airlines.

History

Early history

British West Indian Airways was established on 27 November 1939 by New Zealander Lowell Yerex.  Operations started on 27 November 1940 with a Lockheed Lodestar twin on daily services between Trinidad and Barbados.  By 1942, the airline had three aircraft of this type. In 1947, BWIA was taken over by British South American Airways (BSAA), after a few months operating as British International Air Lines the 'BWIA' name was restored on 24 June 1948 for operating routes among the Caribbean Islands using Vickers Viking twin piston-engined airliners.
 
In 1949, BSAA merged with British Overseas Airways Corporation and BWIA became a subsidiary of BOAC.  Vickers Viscounts were introduced in 1955 with Bristol Britannias leased in 1960 to fly the long-haul route to London, via New York City. In 1960 BWIA had its head office in Port of Spain, Trinidad.<ref>"World Airline Directory." Flight International. 8 April 1960. 494.</ref> On 1 November 1961, the government of Trinidad and Tobago acquired 90% of the shares in the airline and achieved complete ownership by 1967.

For BWIA the jet age began in 1964 with the introduction of new Boeing 727-100 jetliners billed as the Sunjet, which replaced the Viscount turboprops on the New York route. According to its timetable, in 1968 the airline was operating nonstop Boeing 727 flights from New York to Antigua with continuing no change of plane 727 service to Barbados, St. Lucia and Port of Spain as well as nonstop 727 flights from Miami to Grand Cayman and Montego Bay with continuing no change of plane 727 service to Kingston, San Juan, Puerto Rico, Antigua, St. Lucia, Barbados and Port of Spain, and was also serving Caracas, Guyana, Suriname and Tobago with the 727.  In early 1971 four second-hand Boeing 707 series 200 airliners were purchased from Braniff International Airways and operated on US and intra-Caribbean services until their disposal in late 1975.

Later history
The London route was restarted in 1975 using Boeing 707 jets. In 1976 Peter Look Hong replaced Sven-Erik Svanberg as CEO of BWIA. BWIA became BWIA International Airways in 1980 after a merger with Trinidad and Tobago Air Services (which had been formed by the government in June 1974), becoming the national airline. BWIA aircraft livery had the 'Trinidad and Tobago Airways' adjacent to the 'BWIA International' after the merger. The same year also saw the Boeing 707s replaced on the London service with long-range Lockheed L-1011-500 TriStar wide-body jetliners. In 1986, BWIA bought its first McDonnell Douglas MD-83. The airline also operated stretched McDonnell Douglas DC-9-50 jetliners as well as a Boeing 747-100 jumbo jet at one point.

By 1994, the airline had become partially privatised. A substantial reorganisation of its route network left London and Frankfurt the only European destinations. The airline ordered Boeing 757 and 767 aircraft, then canceled the order in favor of Airbus A321 and Airbus A340 jets; in turn, this order was dropped after only two A321s were delivered. On 22 February 1995, the government of Trinidad and Tobago completed the privatisation of BWIA by turning over majority control of the common stock and management of the airline to a private group of US and Caribbean investors.

In the early 2000s (decade), BWIA changed its livery to a new Caribbean green and blue color scheme with its famous steelpan trademark, the national musical instrument of its home base. The fleet had been upgraded to seven Boeing 737-800 Next Generation aircraft, two Airbus A340-300s, and two Bombardier de Havilland Canada DHC-8 Q300 Dash 8 twin turboprop regional aircraft flown by BWIA's sister airline Tobago Express, which provided service on the short hop between Port of Spain and Trinidad's sister island Tobago as well as other destinations in the region.

By 2003, BWIA had become one of the leading Caribbean airlines, carrying over 1.4 million passengers a year with over 600 departures in the Caribbean and another 60 international departures every week.  BWIA earned roughly US$276 million per year, employed 2,350 staff, had 70 daily flights, and carried 8,100 tonnes (17,900,000 pounds) of air cargo per year. Its inflight magazine, Caribbean Beat'', was well regarded. However, BWIA had also been plagued by losses and had a history of continuous injections of funds from the government of Trinidad and Tobago.  The airline had filed for an IPO, although no date was set.
The airline was owned by the Government of the Republic of Trinidad and Tobago (75%) and private shareholders (25%) and had 2,588 employees (in January 2005). It also had holdings in other airlines: Tobago Express (45%) and LIAT (23.6%).

On September 8, 2006, BWIA West Indies Airways announced its demise, after failed negotiations with the ACAWU, CATTU, Superintendent's Association and BWIA's management. CEO Peter Davies, who joined BWIA in March 2006, said that a new airline, Caribbean Airlines, based in Trinidad and Tobago, would replace BWIA after 66 years of flying the Caribbean skies. Caribbean Airlines remains in current operation.

BWIA's Pilots were represented by the Trinidad and Tobago Airline Pilots Association (TTALPA), which is affiliated to IFALPA. TTALPA is also part of the regional Caribbean Airline Pilots Association (C-ALPA).  The other recognised Unions at BWIA were: Airline Superintendents Association; the Aviation, Communication and Allied Workers Union, which represented ground staff and flight attendants, and the Communication, Transport and General Workers Union which organised middle management and engineers.

Destinations
BWIA served the following destinations during its existence although not all of these destinations were served at the same time:
North America
Canada
Toronto, ON – Toronto Pearson International Airport (YYZ)
United States
Baltimore, MD - Baltimore/Washington International Airport (BWI)
Miami, FL - Miami International Airport (MIA)
New York, NY – John F. Kennedy International Airport (JFK)
Europe
Germany
Frankfurt – Frankfurt Airport (FRA)
Sweden
Stockholm – Arlanda Airport (ARN)
Switzerland
Zurich - Zurich Airport (ZRH) 
United Kingdom
London – Heathrow Airport (LHR)
Manchester – Manchester Airport (MAN)
Caribbean
Antigua and Barbuda
St. John's, Antigua – V. C. Bird International Airport (ANU)
Barbados – Grantley Adams International Airport (BGI) -  Hub
Belize
Belize City - Philip S.W. Goldson International Airport (BZE)
Jamaica
Kingston – Norman Manley International Airport (KIN)
Montego Bay - Sangster International Airport (MBJ)
Grand Cayman - Owen Roberts International Airport (GCM)
Netherlands Antilles
Aruba - Queen Beatrix International Airport (AUA)
St. Maarten – Princess Juliana International Airport (SXM)
Puerto Rico
Carolina (San Juan) (Luis Muñoz Marín International Airport) (SJU)
St. Kitts
Robert L. Bradshaw International Airport (SKB)
St. Lucia
Hewanorra International Airport (UVF)
Vigie Airport (now George F.L. Charles Airport) (SLU)
Trinidad and Tobago
Port of Spain, Trinidad – Piarco International Airport (POS) - Main Hub
Tobago – Crown Point International Airport (TAB)

South America
Guyana
Georgetown – Cheddi Jagan International Airport (GEO) - Hub
Suriname
Paramaribo – Johan Adolf Pengel International Airport (PBM)
Venezuela
Caracas – Simón Bolívar International Airport (CCS)

Through a codeshare agreement with United Airlines, it offered connecting service to Boston, Denver, Chicago–O'Hare, Los Angeles, San Francisco and Seattle/Tacoma. BWIA also had an alliance with another Caribbean airline, LIAT, with both carriers providing combined service to over 30 regional destinations.

Fleet

The BWIA fleet consisted of the following aircraft in August 2006:

In addition, BWIA's regional airline affiliate, Tobago Express, operated de Havilland Canada DHC-8 Q300 Dash 8 turboprop aircraft.

Former fleet

The following aircraft types have been operated by BWIA:

Awards
1995, 1996, 1997 - The "Caribbean's Leading Airline" - by the World Travel Awards

Bibliography

References

External links

 BWIA West Indies Airways (Archive)
 BWIA's Caribbean (Archive)
 BWIA Jet Fleet Detail

 
Defunct airlines of Trinidad and Tobago
Caribbean Airlines
Airlines established in 1939
Airlines disestablished in 2006
Defunct companies of Trinidad and Tobago
Trinidad and Tobago in World War II
1939 establishments in Trinidad and Tobago
2006 disestablishments in Trinidad and Tobago
1939 establishments in the British Empire
2006 disestablishments in the United Kingdom